The Back River is a  river in Friendship, Maine, which empties into the estuary of the Medomak River.

See also 
 List of rivers of Maine

References 

 
 Maine Streamflow Data from the USGS
 Maine Watershed Data From Environmental Protection Agency

Rivers of Lincoln County, Maine
Rivers of Maine